The following lists events that happened during 1990 in Rwanda.

Incumbents 
 President: Juvénal Habyarimana

Events

October
 October 2 - The Tutsi Rwandan Patriotic Front makes an attack from Uganda, starting the Rwandan Civil War.

References

 
Years of the 20th century in Rwanda
1990s in Rwanda
Rwanda
Rwanda